Alice in Wonderland is a platform video game developed by Digital Eclipse Software and published by Nintendo for the Game Boy Color. It was released in North America on October 4, 2000. The game follows the plot of the 1951 animated Disney film of the same name.

Gameplay
 
Alice in Wonderland follows the plot of the 1951 animated Disney film of the same name. The game begins with the player as Alice following the White Rabbit down its hole. The plot is used to change the level design from stage to stage, and gives the player a more varied experience through gameplay.

The game changes the level design based on different stages from the film. Alice changes sizes throughout the game, which makes the platform gameplay feel different throughout the game. Levels often deviate from the main platform areas and include other types of sections: one example is where Alice is placed in her miniature form into a bottle and must navigate rapids. The game includes Game Boy Printer support.

Reception

Alice in Wonderland received above-average reviews according to the review aggregation website GameRankings. GameSpots Tim Tracy felt that the game offered some of the best graphics and gameplay for any portable system. He felt that the game's sound was its weak point. IGNs Craig Harris felt that the game's platform variety was one of its strongest points. He questioned, however, the inclusion difficult areas which could only be completed through trial and error; he thought that younger children playing the game would have difficulty getting past the sections.

The game was a runner-up for GameSpots annual "Best Game Boy Color Game" award, losing to Dragon Warrior I & II.

See also
 Alice's Adventures in Wonderland, original 1865 Lewis Carroll novel

References

External links

2000 video games
Disney video games
Game Boy Color games
Game Boy Color-only games
Alice in Wonderland (franchise)
Video games based on films
Video games based on adaptations
Video games based on Alice in Wonderland
Video games about rabbits and hares
Video games developed in the United States
Digital Eclipse games
Single-player video games